Frog Rock is a glacial erratic on Bainbridge Island, Washington. The frog shape is made of two stacked granite boulders, painted by a pair of local residents to resemble a frog on June 6, 1971, The pair of boulders were reportedly once a single boulder which was dynamited in the 1950s or earlier, in order to remove it from a road right-of-way. After the dynamiting, the rock was known as "Split Rock".

The rock is locally famous, known to be a humorous historic marker, and a notable visitor attraction. It is used by bicyclists as a regrouping point.

A local "resiliency forum" is named for it.

References

Sources

Bainbridge Island, Washington
Glacial erratics of Washington (state)
Roadside attractions in Washington (state)
1971 works
Individual rocks